is a Japanese manga series written and illustrated by Kazuki Funatsu. It was serialized in Shueisha's seinen manga magazine Grand Jump from June 2016 to November 2019, with its chapters collected in nine tankōbon volumes. A sequel, titled Sundome!! Milky Way Another End was serialized in the same magazine from February to December 2020. In North America, the series is licensed for English release by Seven Seas Entertainment.

Publication
Sundome!! Milky Way, written and illustrated by Kazuki Funatsu, was serialized in Shueisha's seinen manga magazine Grand Jump from June 1, 2016, to November 20, 2019. Shueisha collected its chapters in nine tankōbon volumes, released from July 19, 2017, to February 19, 2020. A sequel, titled , was serialized in Grand Jump from February 26 to December 22, 2020. A single volume was released on February 19, 2021.

The series is licensed in North America by Seven Seas Entertainment and published under its Ghost Ship adult imprint.

Volume list

See also
Addicted to Curry, another manga series by the same author
Yokai Girls, another manga series by the same author
Dogeza: I Tried Asking While Kowtowing, another manga series by the same author

References

Further reading

External links
 
 

Harem anime and manga
Science fiction anime and manga
Seinen manga
Seven Seas Entertainment titles
Sex comedy anime and manga
Shueisha manga